Human Disease may refer to:
Disease
"Human Disease", a song by Slayer from Soundtrack to the Apocalypse
"Human Disease", a song by Betty X from Dystopia